Lex animata (the law animate) is a Latin term for the law being embodied in a living entity, usually the sovereign by the grace of God. In that sense a king could be lex animata, a living, breathing law.

Originating in Hellenistic philosophy, the identification of the Roman sovereign as nomos empsychos was established in law by the Byzantine emperor Justinian I in his Novellae Constitutiones, and imported from there into Western civil law by the medieval glossators. Over time, the label was extended from the emperor to the various European kings. In some formulations, the argument went both ways: the king was law, but he could not do but as the law instructed.

History

The concept of nomos empsychos is typically considered to have originated in a Hellenistic theory of kingship, which developed after Alexander the Great in the 3rd–2nd centuries BC and drew on the Platonic idea of the philosopher acting as founding lawgiver to the polis. Aristotle, in his Nicomachean Ethics (mid-4th century BC), already describes the ideal judge as "living justice".

The first surviving use of the form nomos empsychos, however, is found in a pseudo-Pythagorean work, attributed to Archytas but probably dated after 50 BC. The Constantinopolitan orator Themistius used the label to describe Emperor Constantius II in 350 AD, and the concept had gained wide currency by late antiquity. The notion of the emperor as nomos empsychos—later translated into Latin as lex animata—was established officially in the 6th century Corpus Juris Civilis of Justinian I, which would come to serve as one of the foundations of later civil law in the West. Justinian's formulation, compiled by Tribonian, runs:

In the Middle Ages, the glossators of the 12th and 13th centuries, notably Accursius, applied the concept of lex animata to the Holy Roman emperor.

The term was also used of the pope by hierocratic writers, and it was ultimately extended to individual kings, as the French jurist Barthélemy de Chasseneuz did in the case of the king of France in his 1529 Catalogus gloriae mundi. The 14th century Italian jurist Baldus de Ubaldis wrote, "" ("The king is the law animate ... I sleep and my heart, that is, my king, keeps watch"), and in his 1598 The True Law of Free Monarchies, James VI of Scotland also referred to the concept when he affirmed "the old definition ... which makes the King to be a speaking law and the law a dumb King".

The concept of the king as lex animata faced resistance in medieval English law, however. When Parliament ratified the deposition of Richard II in 1399, it listed as one reason the fact that Richard had believed "that the laws were in his own mouth". Despite paralleling Byzantine political ideas in other respects, Islamic philosophy also departed from the notion of nomos empsychos by conceiving the caliphs as administering the sharia established by Muhammad rather than as lawgivers in their own right. The idea of the lex animata was later deconstructed more systematically by Montesquieu and other constitutional thinkers of the Enlightenment, with Montesquieu pronouncing that : "the judge", not the king, "is the law speaking", and the judge is not animate, but "inanimate", deriving rather than inventing the law.

Modern usage 
The idea of lex animata is sometimes used in modern political debate, usually to scorn an opponent for being too self-important or delusional about his insights into the law and constitutional affairs. In judicial circles it is sometimes used in jest, recognising a peer as an authority on the law in general.

See also

References

Medieval law
Latin legal terminology
Roman law
Byzantine law